Víctor Díaz may refer to:

 Victor Hugo Díaz (1927–1977), tango, folklore and jazz harmonicist
 Victor Diaz Lamich (born 1966), Chilean photojournalist
 Víctor Díaz (basketball) (born 1968), basketball player from Venezuela
 Víctor Díaz (baseball) (born 1981), Dominican baseball outfielder
 Víctor Díaz (footballer, born 1988), Spanish footballer
 Víctor Díaz (footballer, born 1991), Spanish footballer